William Harold "Hoot" Flanagan (April 27, 1901 – February 4, 1975 ) was a professional football player from Buckhannon, West Virginia who played during the early years of the National Football League with the Pottsville Maroons from 1925 through 1926. Flanagan attended the University of Pittsburgh and West Virginia Wesleyan College. Flanagan made his NFL debut in 1925 with the Pottsville Maroons where he helped the team win the NFL Championship, before it was stripped from the team due to a disputed rules violation. He played in Pottsville for his entire 2-year career.

Notes 

Players of American football from West Virginia
Pottsville Maroons players
Pittsburgh Panthers football players
West Virginia Wesleyan Bobcats football players
1975 deaths
1901 births
People from Buckhannon, West Virginia